Babagana Umara Zulum  (born 25 August 1969) is a Nigerian professor and politician who has served as governor of Borno State since 2019 under the platform of the All Progressive Congress (APC).

Early life 
Zulum was born on 25 August 1969, in Mafa Local Government Area of Borno State.

Education 
After elementary schooling in Mafa Primary School from 1975 to 1980 and secondary education in Government Secondary School, Monguno from 1980 to 1985, Zulum studied at the University of Maiduguri, where he obtained a degree in Agriculture Engineering after which he served as a youth corps member with Katsina State Polytechnic. He proceeded to the University of Ibadan from 1997 to 1998, where he obtained a master's degree in Agriculture Engineering. In 2005, he enrolled for a PhD in Soil and Water Engineering with the University of Maiduguri which he completed in 2009.

Career 
Babagana's first appointment was in 1989 with Borno State Civil Service as an Assistant Technical Officer in the State's Ministry of Agriculture. 
In 1990, Babagana moved into Borno State Unified Local Government Service as Senior Field Overseer and later Principal Water Engineer. In 2000, he took up an appointment with the University of Maiduguri as an assistant Lecturer where he rose to the rank of Professor. Babagana was Deputy Dean and Acting Dean, Faculty of Engineering in 2010 and 2011 respectively. In 2011, Babagana Umara was appointed the Rector of Polytechnic. Meanwhile, he retained his teaching position in the University of Maiduguri.  In 2015, he was made Commissioner of Reconstruction, Rehabilitation and Resettlement by Governor Kashim Shetima of Borno State, a position he held till 2018.

Politics 
On 1 October 2018, he won the gubernatorial primaries of the All Progressives Congress for Borno State. He was elected to the office of the governor of Borno State in the 2019 Borno gubernatorial election held on 9 March 2019, with 1175440 votes.

Assassination attempts 
Zulum has been the target of several failed assassination attempts by the group Boko Haram.

His convoy was attacked by Boko Haram insurgents on 29 July 2020, on Maiduguri-Damaturu highway. Five people were killed including three policemen.

On 26 September 2020, Zulum and his convoy were again attacked by Boko Haram near Lake Chad. At least 18 people were reportedly killed, including 14 police officers and soldiers and 4 civilians. The death toll was later updated to 30 as more bodies were found.

Three days later, on the 29, Zulum's convoy noticed a donkey on the road and shot at it. After the donkey exploded, insurgents came out of hiding and fired at them. A number of insurgents were killed, whereas no one in the convoy was injured.

On 22 November 2020, Convoy belonging to Zulum was attacked while he was traveling to meet with government officials in Baga. Seven soldiers and two civilians were killed in this ambush, but the governor was unhurt. His appointment was cancelled.

See also
List of Governors of Borno State

Award 
In October 2022, a Nigerian national honour of Commander Of The Order Of The Niger (CON) was conferred on him by President Muhammadu Buhari.

References 

1969 births
Academic staff of the University of Maiduguri
Living people
Nigerian Muslims
University of Maiduguri alumni
All Progressives Congress politicians
Nigerian agriculturalists
University of Ibadan alumni
Governors of Borno State